Lycetts, headquartered in Newcastle upon Tyne, England, is an insurance broker and financial services company which specialises in farming, rural estate and equine insurance, as well as bespoke financial services, household, commercial and bloodstock insurance and risk management advice. Lycetts is part of the Benefact Group (previously Ecclesiastical Insurance), a family of specialist financial services which gives all of its available profits to charity and good causes.

A leading equine insurer, Lycetts sponsors several races and horse trial events.

References

Insurance companies of the United Kingdom
Financial services companies established in 1961
Companies based in Newcastle upon Tyne
Corporate subsidiaries
1961 establishments in England